Robert Lawley, 1st Baron Wenlock (1768 – 10 April 1834) was a British landowner and politician, the eldest son of Sir Robert Lawley, 5th Baronet and Jane Thompson.

Lawley attended the military school at Brienne, France, at the time Napoleon Bonaparte was there.

His seat was Canwell Hall, Staffordshire and he served as High Sheriff of Staffordshire in 1797.

In 1793 he married Anna Maria Denison (19 October 1770–20 August 1850), younger daughter of the banker Joseph Denison, but the couple had no children. In 1825 he befriended John Hollins and they journeyed to Italy together.

He was raised to the peerage as Baron Wenlock, of Wenlock in the County of Salop in 1831. Upon his death in Florence on 10 April 1834, the Barony became extinct.

References

External links
Text of memorial

Wenlock, Robert Lawley, 1st Baron
Wenlock, Robert Lawley, 1st Baron
Wenlock, Robert Lawley, 1st Baron
Members of the Parliament of the United Kingdom for Newcastle-under-Lyme
UK MPs 1802–1806
UK MPs who were granted peerages
High Sheriffs of Staffordshire
Peers of the United Kingdom created by William IV